The 1905 Cincinnati Reds season was a season in American baseball. The team finished fifth in the National League with a record of 79 wins and 74 losses, 26 games behind the New York Giants.

Regular season 
The Reds were coming off a third-place finish in 1904, as they went 88–65, eighteen games behind the powerful New York Giants.  The 88 wins by Cincinnati was their highest total since 1898.

Player-manager Joe Kelley returned for his fourth season. Kelley moved from first base to the outfield, as the Reds acquired first baseman Shad Barry from the Chicago Cubs very early in the 1905 season. Some other new faces on the team included pitcher Orval Overall, who went 32–25 with a 2.78 ERA in 56 starts with the Tacoma Tigers of the Pacific Coast League in 1904, and pitcher Charlie Chech, who joined Cincinnati from the St. Paul Saints of the American Association. Chech had a 27–8 record in 35 starts.

Cy Seymour had a career season, leading the National League with a .377 batting average, 219 hits, 40 doubles, 21 triples, and driving in 121 runs.  Seymour also had eight home runs, second on the club. Fred Odwell led Cincinnati with nine home runs, while he had a .241 average and drove in 65 runs. Miller Huggins hit .273 with a homer and 38 RBI, while scoring a team best 117 runs and walking 103 times. Tommy Corcoran hit only .248, but he had two homers and drove in 85 runs. Barry also played well following his trade from the Cubs, hitting .324 with a homer and 56 RBI with Cincinnati.

With Noodles Hahn missing most of the season due to an injury, Bob Ewing emerged as the ace, going 20–11 with a 2.51 ERA. Orval Overall went 18–23 with a 2.86 ERA in 39 starts in his rookie season, while Charlie Chech went 14–14 with a 2.89 ERA in his first season. In limited action, Hahn was 5–3 with a 2.81 ERA in thirteen games, eight of them starts.

Season summary 
The Reds got off to a bad start in 1905, going 12–16 in their opening twenty-eight games, sitting in fifth place, 10.5 games behind the New York Giants. To make matters worse, the Reds lost ace pitcher Noodles Hahn to an arm injury. Cincinnati stayed around the .500 mark until going on an eight-game winning streak to up their record to 32–24, and found themselves in third place, 6.5 games back. The team then won only three of thirteen games to fall back into fifth, 14.5 games behind the Giants.   The Reds played out the rest of the season in fifth place, as they finished with a 79–74 record, 26 games behind New York.

Season standings

Record vs. opponents

Roster

Player stats

Batting

Starters by position 
Note: Pos = Position; G = Games played; AB = At bats; H = Hits; Avg. = Batting average; HR = Home runs; RBI = Runs batted in

Other batters 
Note: G = Games played; AB = At bats; H = Hits; Avg. = Batting average; HR = Home runs; RBI = Runs batted in

Pitching

Starting pitchers 
Note: G = Games pitched; IP = Innings pitched; W = Wins; L = Losses; ERA = Earned run average; SO = Strikeouts

Other pitchers 
Note: G = Games pitched; IP = Innings pitched; W = Wins; L = Losses; ERA = Earned run average; SO = Strikeouts

Relief pitchers 
Note: G = Games pitched; W = Wins; L = Losses; SV = Saves; ERA = Earned run average; SO = Strikeouts

References 
1905 Cincinnati Reds season at Baseball Reference

Cincinnati Reds seasons
Cincinnati Reds season
Cincinnati Reds